The 301st Bombardment Squadron is an inactive United States Air Force unit.  It was last assigned to the 4135th Strategic Wing.  It was inactivated at Eglin Air Force Base, Florida on 1 February 1963.

History
Established in 1952 as an RB-36 Peacemaker strategic reconnaissance squadron. Conducted global strategic reconnaissance 1953–1955, gradually shifting to a bombardment training mission beginning in 1964.  Re-equipped with standard B-36J strategic bombers, conducting worldwide training exercises and standing nuclear alert.  In 1959 with the phaseout of the B-36, was reassigned to SAC provisional 4135th Strategic Wing, being re-equipped with B-52G Stratofortress intercontinental heavy bombers. Was reassigned to Eglin AFB, Florida.

At Eglin, the squadron participated in testing at Eglin for North American AGM-28 Hound Dog supersonic, jet-powered, air-launched cruise missile.  In July 1960, the Hound Dog reached initial operational capability with the 301st BS being first B-52 unit.   In 1960, SAC developed procedures so that the B-52 could utilize the Hound Dog's J52 engine for additional thrust while the missile was located on the bomber's pylon. This helped heavily laden B-52s into the air. The Hound Dog could then be refueled from the B-52's wing fuel tanks.

One Hound Dog missile crashed near the town of Samson, Alabama when it failed to self-destruct after a test launch at Eglin AFB. In 1962, a Hound Dog was accidentally dropped to the ground during an under-wing check.
In May 1962, operation "Silk Hat" was conducted at Eglin AFB. During this exercise a Hound Dog test launch was conducted before an audience of international dignitaries headed by U.S. President John F. Kennedy and U.S. Vice President Lyndon B Johnson.

Was inactivated in 1963 when SAC inactivated its provisional Strategic Wings, redesignating them permanent Air Force Wings.  Squadron was inactivated with aircraft/personnel/equipment being redesignated 62d Bombardment Squadron in an in-place, name-only transfer.

Squadron had no officially approved patch, but many members wore a tiger head patch while at Ramey AB.

Lineage
 Established as 301st Strategic Reconnaissance Squadron, Heavy on 4 June 1952.
 Activated: on 16 June 1952
 Redesignated: 301st Bombardment Squadron, Heavy on 1 October 1955
 Discontinued, and inactivated on 1 February 1963; personnel/aircraft/equipment transferred to the 62d Bombardment Squadron

Assignments
 72d Strategic Reconnaissance (later Bombardment) Wing, 16 June 1952 – 17 June 1959 (not operational: 16 Jun – 15 Mar 1953; 11 1958 – 17 Jun 1959)
 4135th Strategic Wing, 17 June 1959 – 1 February 1963

Stations
 Ramey Air Force Base, Porto Rico, 16 June 1952
 Eglin AFB, Florida, 17 June 1959 – 1 February 1963

Aircraft
 RB-36 Peacemaker, 1952–1958
 B-52 Stratofortress, 1959–1963

See also
 List of B-52 Units of the United States Air Force

References

External links

Bombardment squadrons of the United States Air Force
Military units and formations established in 1952